Vladimir Fyodorovich Lisitsin (20 August 1938 – 8 August 1971) was a Soviet football player.

Honours
 Soviet Top League winner: 1969.
 Soviet Cup winner: 1965.

International career
Lisitsin played his only game for USSR on 20 May 1964 in a friendly against Uruguay.

External links
  Profile

1938 births
1971 suicides
Soviet footballers
Soviet Union international footballers
PFC CSKA Moscow players
FC Dynamo Moscow players
Expatriate footballers in Kazakhstan
Soviet Top League players
FC Spartak Moscow players
FC Kairat players
Russian footballers
Russian expatriate sportspeople in Kazakhstan
Association football goalkeepers
1971 deaths
Suicides by hanging in the Soviet Union